The diplomatic post of United States ambassador to the Czech Republic was created after the dissolution of Czechoslovakia and the United States recognizing the new nation of the Czech Republic on January 1, 1993.

In June 1992, the Slovak parliament voted to declare sovereignty and the Czech-Slovak federation dissolved peacefully on January 1, 1993. The United States recognized the Czech Republic and Slovakia as independent nations and moved to establish diplomatic relations. The previous ambassador to Czechoslovakia, Adrian A. Basora, continued as the ambassador to the Czech Republic and Theodore Russell, who served as deputy chief of mission under Ambassador Shirley Temple Black, became  the first U.S. ambassador to Slovakia later that year.

Ambassadors

See also
Embassy of the United States, Prague
Czech Republic – United States relations
Foreign relations of the Czech Republic
Ambassadors of the United States

References
 United States Department of State: Background notes on the Czech Republic

Specific

External links
 United States Department of State: Chiefs of Mission for Czech Republic
 United States Department of State: Czech Republic
 United States Embassy in Prague

Czech Republic
Main
United States